is a former Japanese badminton player who affiliated with Unisys team.

Career 
Saeki was born in Okayama Prefecture, and in 2005 he won the boys' singles bronze at the Asian Junior Championships. In 2013, he won the men's doubles title at the Austrian International Challenge tournament, and at the same year, he won the men's doubles bronze at the 2013 East Asian Games. He also helps the Japanese men's team to win silver at the 2016 Asia Team Championships. Saeki plays for the Unisys team for seven year, and in March 2017, he announced his retirement.

Achievements

East Asian Games 
Men's doubles

Asian Junior Championships 
Boys' singles

BWF World Tour 
The BWF World Tour, announced on 19 March 2017 and implemented in 2018, is a series of elite badminton tournaments, sanctioned by Badminton World Federation (BWF). The BWF World Tour are divided into six levels, namely World Tour Finals, Super 1000, Super 750, Super 500, Super 300 (part of the HSBC World Tour), and the BWF Tour Super 100.

Men's doubles

BWF Grand Prix 
The BWF Grand Prix had two levels, the BWF Grand Prix and Grand Prix Gold. It was a series of badminton tournaments sanctioned by the Badminton World Federation (BWF) which was held from 2007 to 2017.

Men's doubles

  BWF Grand Prix Gold tournament
  BWF Grand Prix tournament

BWF International Challenge/Series 
Men's singles

Men's doubles

  BWF International Challenge tournament
  BWF International Series tournament

References

External links 
 
 

1987 births
Living people
Sportspeople from Okayama Prefecture
Japanese male badminton players
21st-century Japanese people